"Happiness Is a Thing Called Joe" is a song composed by Harold Arlen, with lyrics written by Yip Harburg, it was written for the 1943 film musical Cabin in the Sky, recorded by the MGM Studio Orchestra and sung by Ethel Waters. The song was nominated for the Academy Award for Best Original Song in 1943 but lost out to "You'll Never Know".

The song has subsequently been recorded by a multitude of artists including Peggy Lee, Ella Fitzgerald, Judy Garland, Nancy Wilson, Bette Midler and Cher.

References

1943 songs
Songs written for films
Songs with music by Harold Arlen
Songs with lyrics by Yip Harburg
Pop standards
Nancy Wilson (jazz singer) songs
Bette Midler songs
Cher songs